Haleh Afshar, Baroness Afshar,  (21 May 1944 – 12 May 2022) was a British life peer in the House of Lords. She had a life-long interest in women's rights and Islamic law. She was a professor at the University of York and she wrote over a dozen scholarly books.

Life and career
Haleh Afshar was the eldest of four children born to Hassan Afshar and Pouran Khabir. She was born on 21 May 1944 in Tehran. Her father was at one point a government minister and he was a Professor of law at Tehran University and her mother successfully campaigned for women to gain the vote. She went first to the Jeanne d’Arc school in Tehran until at 14 she was boarding in Solihull to attend school there. She joined the new University of York after completing her A-levels in Brighton and she gained her first degree in 1967 in Social Sciences. Five years later she gained a diploma from the University of Strasbourg before completing a doctorate at the University of Cambridge in 1974 in Land Economy. She then returned to work in Iran's land reform ministry. She also worked as a journalist and her research led her to understand that many Iranian women did not understand their Islamic rights. Her journalism led her into exile as an article about the Royal family was not well received. In 1976 she was lecturing at the University of Bradford.

Afshar became a professor of politics and women's studies at the University of York, and a visiting professor of Islamic law at the Faculté internationale de droit comparé (international faculty of comparative law) at Robert Schuman University in Strasbourg, France. Afshar served on the British Council and the United Nations Association, of which she was honorary president of international services. She was appointed to the board of the Women's National Commission in September 2008. She served as the chair for the British Society for Middle Eastern Studies. Afshar was a founding member of the Muslim Women's Network. She served on the Home Office's working groups, on "engaging with women" and "preventing extremism together".

She was appointed an Officer of the Order of the British Empire in the 2005 Birthday Honours. for services to equal opportunities. On 18 October 2007 it was announced that she would be made a baroness and join the House of Lords as a cross-bench life peer. She was introduced into the House of Lords on 11 December 2007, as Baroness Afshar, of Heslington in the County of North Yorkshire.

In March 2009, she was named as one of the twenty most successful Muslim women in the UK on the Muslim Women Power List 2009. The list was a collaboration between the Equality and Human Rights Commission, Emel Magazine and The Times, to celebrate the achievements of Muslim women in the UK.

In April 2009, she was appointed an academician of the Academy of Social Sciences.

Afshar died from kidney failure at her home in Heslington on 12 May 2022 at the age of 77.

Honours 
In 2011, Afshar received an honorary doctorate from the University of Essex.

In January 2013, Afshar was nominated for the Services to Education award at the British Muslim Awards.

In 2017, Afshar received an honorary doctorate from the University of Bradford.

Works
Afshar wrote about Iran and Iranian politics both for academia and the media. Her books include Islam and Feminisms: An Iranian Case Study (Macmillan, 1998), and Islam and the Post Revolutionary State in Iran (Macmillan, 1994). She edited thirteen books on women and development.

References

External links
University of York Post-War Reconstruction and Development Unit staff profile
University of York staff profile
Persian Mirror Biography of Haleh Afshar
Biography on the Muslim Women Power List website
Interview on Desert Island Discs on BBC Radio 4, broadcast 28 December 2008
Transcript of interview on BBC 'Belief' programme.
Nouse.co.uk Haleh Afshar takes House of Lords peerage
Naseeb.com interview, 2005
"Peace and Reconstruction in the Middle East: Where are the Women?" Lecture given at University of Oxford on 27 May 2009
Profile at Parliament of the United Kingdom
 

1944 births
2022 deaths
Iranian dissidents
Iranian expatriate academics
Iranian feminists
Proponents of Islamic feminism
Academics of the University of York
Iranian emigrants to the United Kingdom
Alumni of New Hall, Cambridge
Alumni of the University of York
Crossbench life peers
English feminists
English socialists
British Shia Muslims
British politicians of Iranian descent
Fellows of the Academy of Social Sciences
Officers of the Order of the British Empire
Academics of the University of Bradford
Life peeresses created by Elizabeth II
Iranian women journalists
English women journalists
Land reform
People's peers
Politicians from Tehran
20th-century Iranian women politicians
20th-century Iranian politicians